Kalas or Kalaš (Czech feminine forms: Kalasová, Kalašová) is a surname. Notable people include:

 Ellsworth Kalas (1923–2015), American seminary president
 Freddy Kalas (born 1990), Norwegian singer
 Harry Kalas (1936–2009), American sportscaster
 Josef Kalaš, Czechoslovak rower
 Kane Kalas (born 1989), American poker player
 Karel Kalaš (1910–2001), Czech actor
 Klementina Kalašová (1850–1889), Czech opera singer
 Milan Kalas, Czechoslovak canoeist
 Paul Kalas (born 1967), American astronomer
 Todd Kalas (born 1965), American sportscaster
 Tomáš Kalas (born 1993), Czech footballer

See also
 

Czech-language surnames